Olaf Sverressøn Klingenberg (14 August 1886 – 24 August 1968) was the Norwegian barrister and politician for the Conservative Party.

Personal life 
He was born in Strinda as a son of attorney Sverre Olafssøn Klingenberg (1844–1913) and Hilda Johannesdatter Klingenberg (1843–1912). He was a brother of Odd, Sverre and Kaare Sverressøn Klingenberg and a grandson and grandnephew of engineer Johannes Benedictus Klingenberg. In 1913 he married Hjørdis Bergland, daughter of a vicar.

Career 
He finished his secondary education in 1905 and graduated from the Royal Frederick University with the cand.jur. degree in 1910. He settled in Trondhjem as an attorney in 1918, as a partner in the law firm of his brother Odd. From 1922 he was a barrister with access to working with Supreme Court cases, as a law firm partner of attorney Borgersen until 1934. He was also a defender in the courts of appeal from 1922.

He represented the Conservative Party in Trondhjem city council for many years from 1926. He served as deputy mayor from 1926 to 1928. He chaired the board of E. C. Dahls Bryggeri and the supervisory council of Nordenfjeldske Dampskibsselskab. He died in August 1968.

References 

1886 births
1968 deaths
People from Trondheim
University of Oslo alumni
20th-century Norwegian lawyers
Politicians from Trondheim
Conservative Party (Norway) politicians
Olaf